Jean-Marc Gardette (born 4 July 1984) is a Seychellois sailor. He placed 33rd in the men's RS:X event at the 2016 Summer Olympics.

References

External links
 
 
 

1984 births
Living people
Seychellois windsurfers
Seychellois male sailors (sport)
Olympic sailors of Seychelles
Sailors at the 2016 Summer Olympics – RS:X